Liniparhomaloptera is a genus of fish in the family Gastromyzontidae found in China and Vietnam.

Species
There are currently 5 recognized species in this genus:
 Liniparhomaloptera disparis (S. Y. Lin, 1934)
 Liniparhomaloptera macrostoma T. J. Wu, L. H. Xiu & J. Yang, 2016 
 Liniparhomaloptera monoloba (Đ. Y. Mai, 1978)
 Liniparhomaloptera obtusirostris C. Y. Zheng & Y. Y. Chen, 1980
 Liniparhomaloptera qiongzhongensis C. Y. Zheng & Y. Y. Chen, 1980

References

Gastromyzontidae
Fish of Asia
Freshwater fish genera